Hanil Life Insurance Company FC is defunct South Korean semi-professional football club. They played in the Korean Cup in 1997, losing in the second round to Suwon Samsung Bluewings.

Honours

Domestic
 Korea Semi-Professional Football League Winners (2) : 1997 Autumn, 1998 Spring
 Korean National Football Championship Winners (2) : 1997, 1998

Notable players

References

S
B
1996 establishments in South Korea
1998 disestablishments in South Korea
Financial services association football clubs in South Korea